Nulloy is a free and open-source, small, multiplatform audio player with unique feature — progress bar in the form of waveform. Build with C++, Qt. First release was back in 2011. Running under Linux, macOS, and Windows. For the macOS and Windows operating systems, the developer provides binaries, for Linux it is available in some repositories, and the C source is available.

Features 

 Able to play all the audio formats supported by Gstreamer (such as MP3, AAC, OGG Vorbis, WMA, FLAC, WAV etc.)
 Create and save playlists
 Gapless playback
 Drag-n-Drop support
 Easy on system resources (about 15-18MB of RAM)
 Two built in skins: light and dark, the default one is chosen by settings of operating system
 Tags & Cover Art support
 Keyboard shortcuts
 Unity application launcher integration, Windows task bar support
 System tray support
 Restarting playback from the last location (can be disabled)
 Automatic update checking

References 

Free audio software
Free media players
Linux media players
Audio player software for Linux
Free software programmed in C++
Audio player software that uses Qt
MacOS media players
Windows multimedia software
Software that uses GStreamer